Jürgen Henke is a retired Olympic trap shooter from East Germany who won silver medals at the world championships in 1969 and 1971.

References

Living people
Year of birth missing (living people)
German male sport shooters